Within the context of Coordinated Universal Time (UTC) it was the longest year ever, as two leap seconds were added during this 366-day year, an event which has not since been repeated. (If its start and end are defined using mean solar time [the legal time scale], its duration was 31622401.141 seconds of Terrestrial Time (or Ephemeris Time), which is slightly shorter than 1908).

Events

January

 January 1 – Kurt Waldheim becomes Secretary-General of the United Nations.
 January 4 - The first scientific hand-held calculator (HP-35) is introduced (price $395).
 January 7 – Iberia Airlines Flight 602 crashes into a 462-meter peak on the island of Ibiza; 104 are killed.
 January 9 – The RMS Queen Elizabeth is destroyed by fire in Hong Kong harbor.
 January 10 – Independence leader Sheikh Mujibur Rahman returns to Bangladesh after spending over nine months in prison in Pakistan.
 January 11 – Sheikh Mujibur Rahman declares a new constitutional government in Bangladesh, with himself as president.
 January 12 – In a 10-hour siege, a cell of 4 left-wing insurgents hold off a task force of 2500 army soldiers and police agents in Santo Domingo, Dominican Republic: eight members of the security forces and the entire insurgent cell are killed in the course of the siege.
 January 13 – In Ghana Prime Minister of Ghana Kofi Abrefa Busia is overthrown in a military coup by Colonel Ignatius Kutu Acheampong.
 January 14 – Queen Margrethe II of Denmark succeeds her father, King Frederick IX, on the throne of Denmark, the first Queen of Denmark since 1412 and the first Danish monarch not named Frederick or Christian since 1513.
January 18 – Members of the Mukti Bahini lay down their arms to the government of the newly independent Bangladesh, 33 days after winning the war against the occupying Pakistan Army.
 January 19 – The Libertarian enclave Minerva on a platform in the South Pacific, sponsored by the Phoenix Foundation, declares independence. Soon neighboring Tonga annexes the area and dismantles the platform.
 January 20 – President Zulfikar Ali Bhutto announces that Pakistan will immediately begin a nuclear weapons program.
 January 21
 A New Delhi bootlegger sells wood alcohol to a wedding party; 100 people die.
 Tripura, part of the former independent Twipra Kingdom, becomes a full state of India.
 January 24 – Japanese soldier Shoichi Yokoi is discovered in Guam; he had spent 28 years in the jungle, having failed to surrender after World War II.
 January 26
 Yugoslavian air stewardess Vesna Vulović is the only survivor when her plane crashes in Czechoslovakia. She survives after falling 10,160 meters (33,330 feet) in the tail section of the aircraft. 
 The Aboriginal Tent Embassy is set up on the lawn of Parliament House in Canberra.
 January 30
 Bloody Sunday: The British Army kills 14 unarmed nationalist civil rights marchers in Derry, Northern Ireland.
 Pakistan withdraws from the Commonwealth of Nations.
 January 31 – King Birendra succeeds his father as King of Nepal.

February 

 February 2
 A bomb explodes at the British Yacht Club in West Berlin, killing Irwin Beelitz, a German boat builder. The German militant group 2 June Movement claims responsibility, announcing its support of the Provisional Irish Republican Army.
 Anti-British riots take place throughout Ireland. The British Embassy in Dublin is burned to the ground, as are several British-owned businesses.
 February 3–13 – The 1972 Winter Olympics are held in Sapporo, Japan.
 February 4 – Mariner 9 sends pictures as it orbits Mars.
 February 15 – President of Ecuador José María Velasco Ibarra is deposed for the fourth time.
 February 17 – Volkswagen Beetle sales exceed those of the Ford Model T when the 15,007,034th Beetle is produced.
 February 19 – Asama-Sansō incident: Five United Red Army members break into a lodge below Mount Asama, taking the wife of the lodge keeper hostage.
 February 21 – The Soviet unmanned spaceship Luna 20 lands on the Moon.
 February 21 – February 28 – U.S. President Richard M. Nixon makes an unprecedented 8-day visit to the People's Republic of China and meets with Mao Zedong.
 February 22
 The Troubles: A bombing by the Official IRA kills seven people in Aldershot, England.
 Lufthansa Flight 649 is hijacked and taken to Aden. Passengers are released the following day after a ransom of 5 million US dollars is agreed.
 February 23 – US activist Angela Davis is released from jail. Rodger McAfee, a farmer from Caruthers, California, helps her make bail.
 February 26 – Luna 20 comes back to Earth with 55 grams (1.94 oz) of lunar soil.
 February 28 – The Asama-Sanso incident ends in a standoff between 5 members of the Japanese United Red Army and the authorities, in which two policemen are killed and 12 injured.

March 

 March 1 – Juan María Bordaberry is sworn in as President of Uruguay amid accusations of electoral fraud.
 March 2
 The Club of Rome presents the research results leading to its report The Limits to Growth, published later in the month.
 The Pioneer 10 spacecraft is launched from Cape Kennedy, to be the first man-made spacecraft to leave the solar system.
 Jean-Bédel Bokassa becomes President of the Central African Republic.
 March 4
 Libya and the Soviet Union sign a cooperation treaty.
 The Organisation of the Islamic Conference Charter is signed (effective February 28, 1973).
 March 5 – Greek composer Mikis Theodorakis leaves the Greek Communist Party.
 March 19 – India and Bangladesh sign the Indo-Bangladeshi Treaty of Friendship, Cooperation and Peace.
 March 22 
The 92nd U.S. Congress votes to send the proposed Equal Rights Amendment to the states for ratification.
Eisenstadt v. Baird: The Supreme Court of the U.S. rules that unmarried people have the right to access contraception on the same basis as married couples
 March 25 – Après toi sung by Vicky Leandros (music by Klaus Munro & Mario Panas, lyric by Klaus Munro & Yves Dessca) wins the Eurovision Song Contest 1972 for Luxembourg.
 March 26 – An avalanche on Mount Fuji kills 19 climbers.
 March 27 – The First Sudanese Civil War ends.
 March 30 – Vietnam War: The Easter Offensive begins after North Vietnamese forces cross into the Demilitarized Zone (DMZ) of South Vietnam

April 

 April 10
 The U.S. and the Soviet Union join some 70 nations in signing the Biological Weapons Convention, an agreement to ban biological warfare.
 Tombs containing bamboo slips, among them Sun Tzu's Art of War and Sun Bin's lost military treatise, are accidentally discovered by construction workers in Shandong.
 The 6.7  Qir earthquake shakes southern Iran with a maximum Mercalli intensity of IX (Violent), killing 5,374 people in the province of Fars.
 The 44th Annual Academy Awards are held at the Dorothy Chandler Pavilion in Los Angeles.
 April 13 – The Universal Postal Union decides to recognize the People's Republic of China as the only legitimate Chinese representative, effectively expelling the Republic of China administering Taiwan.
 April 16
 Apollo 16 (John Young, Ken Mattingly, Charlie Duke) is launched. During the mission, the astronauts, driving the Lunar Roving Vehicle, achieve a lunar rover speed record of 18 km/h.
 Vietnam War – Nguyen Hue Offensive: Prompted by the North Vietnamese offensive, the United States resumes bombing of Hanoi and Haiphong.
 April 26 – The Lockheed L-1011 TriStar enters service with Eastern Airlines.
 April 27
 The Burundian Genocide against the Hutu begins; more than 500,000 Hutus die.
 A no-confidence vote against German Chancellor Willy Brandt fails under obscure circumstances.
 April 29 – The fourth anniversary of the Broadway musical Hair is celebrated with a free concert at a Central Park bandshell, followed by dinner at the Four Seasons. There, 13 Black Panther protesters and the show's co-author, Jim Rado, are arrested for disturbing the peace and for using marijuana.

May 

 May 2 – Fire at the Sunshine Mine, a silver mine in Idaho, kills 91.
 May 5 – An Alitalia DC-8 crashes west of Palermo, Sicily; 115 die.
 May 7 – General elections are held in Italy.
 May 10 – Operation Linebacker and Operation Custom Tailor begin with large-scale bombing operations against North Vietnam by tactical fighter aircraft.
 May 13 – A fire in a nightclub atop the Sennichi department store in Osaka, Japan, kills 115.
 May 21 – In St. Peter's Basilica (Vatican City), Laszlo Toth attacks Michelangelo's Pietà statue with a geologist's hammer, shouting that he is Jesus Christ.
 May 22
 The Dominion of Ceylon becomes the republic of Sri Lanka under prime minister Sirimavo Bandaranaike, when its new constitution is ratified.
 Ferit Melen forms the new (interim) government of Turkey (35th government)
 May 23 – The Tamil United Front (later known as Tamil United Liberation Front), a pro-Tamil organization, is founded in Sri Lanka.
 May 26
 Richard Nixon and Leonid Brezhnev sign the SALT I treaty in Moscow, as well as the Anti-Ballistic Missile Treaty and other agreements.
 Willandra National Park is established in Australia.
 May 27 – Mark Donohue wins the Indianapolis 500 in a Penske Racing McLaren–Offenhauser.
 May 30 
 Lod Airport massacre: Three Japanese Red Army members operating on behalf of the Popular Front for the Liberation of Palestine – External Operations kill 26 and injure 80 people at Lod Airport, Israel.
 The Troubles: The Official IRA declares a ceasefire.

June 

 June – Iraq nationalizes the Iraq Petroleum Company.
 June 3 – Sally Priesand becomes the first American woman (and the second known woman anywhere) to be ordained as a rabbi within Judaism.
 June 5–16 – The United Nations Conference on the Human Environment is held in Stockholm, Sweden
 June 8
 Seven men and three women hijack a plane from Czechoslovakia to West Germany.
 Vietnam War: Associated Press photographer Nick Ut takes his Pulitzer Prize-winning photograph of a naked nine-year-old Phan Thi Kim Phuc running down a road after being burned by napalm.
 June 9 – The Black Hills flood kills 238 in South Dakota.
 June 11 – Henri Pescarolo (France) and co-driver former World Drivers' Champion Graham Hill (Britain) win the 24 Hours of Le Mans in the Equipe Matra MS670.
 June 14–23 – Hurricane Agnes kills 117 on the U.S. East Coast.
 June 14 – Japan Airlines Flight 471 crashes outside New Delhi airport, killing 82 of 87 occupants.
 June 16 – 108 die as two passenger trains hit the debris of a collapsed railway tunnel near Soissons, France.
 June 17
 Watergate scandal: Five White House operatives are arrested for burgling the offices of the Democratic National Committee.
 Chilean president Salvador Allende forms a new government.
 June 18
 Staines air disaster: 118 die when a Trident 1 jet airliner crashes two minutes after takeoff from London Heathrow Airport.
 West Germany beats the Soviet Union 3–0 in the final to win Euro '72.
It is the second worst fatality due to building collapses, and the worst flooding in Hong Kong's recorded history.
 June 23
 Watergate scandal: U.S. President Richard M. Nixon and White House chief of staff H. R. Haldeman are taped talking about using the C.I.A. to obstruct the F.B.I.'s investigation into the Watergate break-ins.
 The United Kingdom Chancellor of the Exchequer, Anthony Barber, announces a decision for the pound sterling to move to a floating exchange rate. Although intended to be temporary, this remains permanent. Foreign exchange controls are applied to most members of the sterling area.
 June 30 – The International Time Bureau adds the first leap second (23:59:60) to Coordinated Universal Time (UTC) at the end of the month.

July 

 July 1 – The Canadian ketch Vega, flying the Greenpeace III banner, collides with the French naval minesweeper La Paimpolaise while in international waters, to protest French nuclear weapon tests in the South Pacific.
 July 2 – Following Pakistan's surrender to India in the Indo-Pakistani War of 1971, both nations sign the historic Simla Agreement, agreeing to settle their disputes bilaterally.
 July 4 – The first Rainbow Gathering is held in Colorado.
 July 10 – India's news agency reports that at least 24 people have been killed in separate incidents, in the Chandka Forest in India, by elephants crazed by heat and drought.
 July 11
 The long anticipated chess match between world champion Boris Spassky of the Soviet Union, and United States champion Bobby Fischer, began in Iceland at Reykjavík.
 Curtis Mayfield releases the soundtrack to the 1972 film, Super Fly.
 July 10–14 – The Democratic National Convention meets in Miami Beach. Senator George McGovern, who backs the immediate and complete withdrawal of U.S. troops from South Vietnam, is nominated for president. He names fellow Senator Thomas Eagleton as his running mate.
 July 18 – Anwar Sadat expels 20,000 Soviet advisors from Egypt.
 July 21
 The Troubles: 22 bombs planted by the Provisional IRA explode in Belfast, Northern Ireland; nine people are killed and 130 seriously injured in what has been referred to as Bloody Friday.
 A collision between two trains near Seville, Spain, kills 76 people.
 July 23 – The United States launches Landsat 1, the first Earth-resources satellite.
 July 24 – King Jigme Singye Wangchuck succeeds his father Jigme Dorji Wangchuck as king of Bhutan.
 July 25 – U.S. health officials admit that African-Americans were used as guinea pigs in the Tuskegee Study of Untreated Syphilis in the Negro Male.
 July 27 – The McDonnell Douglas F-15 Eagle makes its first flight.
 July 31 – The Troubles, Northern Ireland:
 Operation Motorman 4:00 AM: The British Army begins to regain control of the "no-go areas" established by Irish republican paramilitaries in Belfast, Derry ("Free Derry") and Newry.
 Claudy bombing ("Bloody Monday"), 10:00 AM: Three car bombs in Claudy, County Londonderry, kill nine. It becomes public knowledge only in 2010 that a local Catholic priest was an IRA officer believed to be involved in the bombings but his role was covered up by the authorities.

August 

 August 4
 Expulsion of Asians from Uganda: Dictator Idi Amin declares that Uganda will expel 50,000 Asians with British passports to Britain within 3 months.
 A huge solar flare (one of the largest ever recorded) knocks out cable lines in the U.S. It begins with the appearance of sunspots on August 2; an August 4 flare kicks off high levels of activity until August 10.
 August 10 – A brilliant, daytime meteor is seen in the western U.S. and Canada as an Apollo asteroid skips off the Earth's atmosphere.
 August 12 – Oil tankers Oswego-Guardian and Texanita collide near Stilbaai, South Africa.
 August 14 – An East German Ilyushin airliner crashes near East Berlin; all 156 on board perish.
 August 16 – As part of a coup attempt, members of the Royal Moroccan Air Force fire upon, but fail to bring down, Hassan II of Morocco's plane while he is traveling back to Rabat.
August 19 – The first daytime episode of the second incarnation of the American game show The Price Is Right is taped at CBS Television City, to be aired on September 4.
 August 21 – The Republican National Convention in Miami Beach, Florida renominates U.S. President Richard Nixon and Vice President Spiro Agnew for a second term.
 August 22
 Rhodesia is expelled by the International Olympic Committee for its racist policies.
 In the Almirante Zar Naval Base, Argentina, 16 detainees are executed by firing squad in the Trelew massacre.
 August 26–September 10 – The 1972 Summer Olympics are held in Munich, West Germany.

September 

 September 1
 Bobby Fischer defeats Boris Spassky in a chess match in Reykjavík, Iceland, becoming the first American world chess champion.
 The Second Cod War begins between the United Kingdom and Iceland.
 September 5–6 – Munich massacre: Eleven Israeli athletes at the 1972 Summer Olympics in Munich are murdered after eight members of the Arab terrorist group Black September invade the Olympic Village; five guerillas and one policeman are also killed in a failed hostage rescue.
 September 10 – The Brazilian driver Emerson Fittipaldi wins the Italian Grand Prix at Monza and becomes the youngest Formula One World Champion at the age of 25.
 September 14 – West Germany and Poland renew diplomatic relations.
 September 17 – Uganda announces that there are Tanzanian troops in its territory.
 September 18 – São Paulo Metro is inaugurated in Brazil.
 September 19 – A parcel bomb sent to the Israeli Embassy in London kills one diplomat.
 September 23 – Philippine president Ferdinand Marcos announces on national television the issuance of Proclamation No. 1081 placing the entire country under martial law.
 September 24 – An F-86 fighter aircraft leaving an air show at Sacramento Executive Airport fails to become airborne and crashes into a Farrell's Ice Cream Parlour, killing 12 children and 11 adults.
 September 25 – 1972 Norwegian EC referendum: Norway rejects membership of the European Economic Community.
 September 28 – The Canadian national men's hockey team defeats the Soviet national ice hockey team in the eighth and final game of the 1972 Summit Series (French: La Série du Siècle, Russian: Суперсерия СССР — Канада), 6–5, to win the series 4–3–1.
 September 29 – Sino-Japanese relations: The Joint Communiqué of the Government of Japan and the Government of the People's Republic of China is signed in Beijing, which normalizes diplomatic relations with the People's Republic of China after breaking official ties with the Republic of China (Taiwan).

October 

 October – The government of former President of Somalia Mohamed Siad Barre formally introduces the Somali alphabet as Somalia's official writing script.
 October 1
 The first publication reporting the production of a recombinant DNA molecule marks the birth of modern molecular biology methodology.
 Alex Comfort's bestselling manual The Joy of Sex is published.
 October 2 – Denmark joins the European Community; the Faroe Islands stay out.
 October 5 – The United Reformed Church is founded out of the Congregational and Presbyterian Churches.
 October 6 – A train crash in Saltillo, Mexico, kills 208 people.
 October 8 – A major breakthrough occurs in the Paris peace talks between Henry Kissinger and Lê Đức Thọ.
Sixteen of the survivors are found alive December 20 but they have had to resort to cannibalism to survive.
 October 22 – The Oakland Athletics defeat the Cincinnati Reds four games to three to capture Major League Baseball's World Series. It is the Athletics' first championship since 1930, when the franchise was in Philadelphia. 
 October 25 – Belgian Eddy Merckx sets a new world hour record in cycling in Mexico City.
 October 26 – A coup in the Republic of Dahomey (actually Benin) led by Mathieu Kérékou removed a civilian government (which had been headed by a triumvirate consisting of Ahomadégbé, Apithy and Maga).
 October 28 – The Airbus A300 flies for the first time.

November 

 November
 At a scientific meeting in Honolulu, Herbert Boyer and Stanley N. Cohen conceive the concept of recombinant DNA. They publish their results in November 1973 in PNAS. Separately in 1972, Paul Berg also recombines DNA in a test tube. Recombinant DNA technology has dramatically changed the field of biological sciences, especially biotechnology, and opened the door to genetically modified organisms.
 The Nishitetsu Lions baseball club, part of the NPB's Pacific League, is sold to the Fukuoka Baseball Corporation, a subsidiary of Nishi-Nippon Railroad. The team is renamed the Taiheiyo Club Lions.
 November 7 – 1972 United States presidential election: Republican incumbent Richard Nixon defeats Democratic Senator George McGovern in a landslide (the election had the lowest voter turnout since 1948, with only 55 percent of the electorate voting).
 November 11 – Vietnam War – Vietnamization: The United States Army turns over the massive Long Binh military base to South Vietnam.
 November 14 – The Dow Jones Industrial Average closes above 1,000 (1,003.16) for the first time.
 November 16 – The United Nations Educational, Scientific and Cultural Organization adopts the Convention Concerning the Protection of the World Cultural and Natural Heritage
 November 19 – Seán Mac Stíofáin, a leader of the Provisional Irish Republican Army, is arrested in Dublin after giving an interview to RTÉ.
 November 28 – The last executions in Paris, France. Roger Bontems and Claude Buffet – the Clairvaux Mutineers – are guillotined at La Santé Prison by chief executioner André Obrecht. Bontems, found not guilty of murder by the court, was condemned as Buffet's accomplice . President Georges Pompidou, in private an abolitionist, upholds both death sentences in deference to French public opinion.
 November 29 – The "tea house" Mellow Yellow opens on the Amstel River in Amsterdam, pioneering the legal sale of cannabis in the Netherlands.

December

 December 2 – 1972 Australian federal election: The Labor Party led by Gough Whitlam defeats the Liberal/Country Coalition Government led by Prime Minister William McMahon. Consequently, Whitlam becomes the first Labor Prime Minister of Australia since the defeat of Ben Chifley in 1949. Whitlam would be sworn in on December 5th; his first action using executive power was to withdraw all Australian personnel from the Vietnam War. McMahon resigned from the Liberal leadership almost immediately; he would be replaced by outgoing Treasurer Billy Snedden.
 December 7
 Apollo 17 (Gene Cernan, Ronald Evans, Harrison Schmitt), the last manned Moon mission to date, is launched and The Blue Marble photograph of the Earth is taken. The mission also includes five mice.
 Imelda Marcos is stabbed and seriously wounded by an assailant; her bodyguards shoot the assailant.
 December 8
 United Airlines Flight 553 crashes short of the runway, killing 43 of 61 passengers and two people on the ground. A day later, over $10,000 cash is found in the purse of Watergate conspirator Howard Hunt's wife, who was on board.
 International Human Rights Day is proclaimed by the United Nations.
 December 11 – Apollo 17 lands on the Moon.
 December 14 – Apollo program: Eugene Cernan is the last person to walk on the Moon, after he and Harrison Schmitt complete the third and final Extra-vehicular activity (EVA) of Apollo 17. This is currently the last manned mission to the Moon.
 December 15
 The Commonwealth of Australia ordains equal pay for women.
 The United Nations Environment Programme is established as a specialized agency of the United Nations.
 December 16
 The Constitution of Bangladesh comes into effect.
 The Portuguese army kills 400 Africans in Tete, Mozambique.
 December 19 – Apollo program: Apollo 17 returns to Earth, concluding the program of lunar exploration.
 December 21 – ZANLA troopers attack Altera Farm in north-east Rhodesia.
 December 22
 Australia establishes diplomatic relations with China and East Germany.
 A peace delegation that includes singer-activist Joan Baez and human rights attorney Telford Taylor visit Hanoi to deliver Christmas mail to American prisoners of war (they will be caught in the Christmas bombing of North Vietnam).
 December 23
 The 6.2  Nicaragua earthquake kills 5,000–11,000 people in the capital Managua. President Anastasio Somoza Debayle is later accused of not distributing millions of dollars worth of foreign aid.
 Swedish Prime minister Olof Palme compares the American bombings of North Vietnam to Nazi massacres. The U.S. breaks diplomatic contact with Sweden.
 Braathens SAFE Flight 239, also known as the Asker Accident: Aircraft crashed during approach to Oslo Airport, Fornebu, Norway. Forty people on board were killed.
 December 28 – The bones of Martin Bormann are discovered in Berlin.
 December 29 – Eastern Air Lines Flight 401 crashes into the Everglades in Florida, killing 101 of 176 on board. It is the first hull-loss of a wide-body aircraft.
 December 31 – For the first and last time, a 2nd leap second is added (23:59:60) to a year, making 1972 366 days and two seconds long, the longest year ever within the context of UTC.

Date unknown
 Colombian looters find Ciudad Perdida but keep it a secret until the government reveals it in 1975.
 The Socialist Federal Republic of Yugoslavia bans the cultural organization Matica hrvatska, founded in 1842.
Los Velázquez, an Argentine film is released.

Births

January

 January 1 - Lilian Thuram, French football player
 January 2 – Shiraz Minwalla, Indian theoretical physicist and string theorist
 January 5 
 Ariel McDonald, American-Slovenian basketball player
 Sakis Rouvas, Greek recording, film and television artist, athlete and businessman 
 January 10 – Thomas Alsgaard, Norwegian cross-country skier
 January 11 – Amanda Peet, American actress
 January 12 – Toto Wolff, Austrian former racing driver and team principal
 January 13 
 Nicole Eggert, American actress
 Vitaly Scherbo, Belarusian gymnast
 January 16 – Salah Hissou, Moroccan long-distance runner
 January 20 – Nikki Haley, Indian-American politician, Governor of South Carolina (2010-2017) and former U.S. Ambassador to the United Nations (2017-2018)
 January 21 – Billel Dziri, Algerian footballer and manager
 January 22 – Gabriel Macht, American actor
 January 23 
 Léa Drucker, French actress
 Marcel Wouda, Dutch swimmer
 January 27
Bibi Gaytán, Mexican singer and actress
 Mark Owen, British pop singer (Take That)
 Keith Wood, Irish rugby player
January 28 – Amy Coney Barrett, American attorney, jurist, and associate justice, U.S. Supreme Court

February

 February 1 
 Tego Calderón, Puerto Rican hip hop musician and actor
 Leymah Gbowee, Liberian peace activist, Nobel Peace Prize laureate
 February 2
 Klára Dobrev, wife of Hungarian Prime Minister Ferenc Gyurcsány
 Hendrick Ramaala, South African long-distance runner
February 3 - Michael Kovrig, Canadian diplomat and hostage victim
 February 5 – Mary, Crown Princess of Denmark
 February 8 – Big Show, American professional wrestler
 February 9 – Norbert Rózsa, Hungarian swimmer
 February 11
 Craig Jones, American sampler / keyboardist
 Steve McManaman, British footballer
 Kelly Slater, American professional surfer
 February 13 
 Virgilijus Alekna, Lithuanian discus thrower
 Ana Paula Connelly, Brazilian beach volleyball player
 February 14 – Rob Thomas, American singer-songwriter (Matchbox Twenty)
 February 15 – Jaromír Jágr, Czech hockey player
 February 17
 Billie Joe Armstrong, American rock musician and lead singer/guitarist (Green Day)
 Taylor Hawkins, American musician (d. 2022)
 Ralphie May, American stand-up comedian and actor (d. 2017)
 Valeria Mazza, Argentinian model and businesswoman
 February 18 – Olexandra Timoshenko, Ukrainian rhythmic gymnast
 February 21 – Seo Taiji, Korean musician
 February 22
 Michael Chang, American tennis player
 Claudia Pechstein, German speed-skater
 Haim Revivo, Israeli footballer
 February 24
 Pooja Bhatt, Indian actress
 Richard Chelimo, Kenyan athlete (d. 2001)
 February 26 – Keith Ferguson, American voice actor
 February 29 
Dave Williams, American singer (d. 2002)
Pedro Sánchez, Spanish politician, Prime Minister 2018-

March

 March 3 – Darren Anderton, English footballer
 March 4
 Pae Gil-su, North Korean gymnast
 Jos Verstappen, Dutch racing driver
 March 6
 Shaquille O'Neal, American basketball player
 Marianne Thieme, Dutch politician and activist
 March 9
 Jodey Arrington, American politician
 Ronald Cheng, Hong Kong singer and actor
 Jean Louisa Kelly, American actress
 March 10
 Takashi Fujii (Matthew Minami), Japanese television performer
 Timbaland, American record producer, songwriter and rapper
 March 13
 Leigh-Allyn Baker, American actress
 Common, African-American rapper and actor
 Reshef Levi, Israeli comedian
 March 15 – Mark Hoppus, American musician and bassist (blink-182)
 March 17 – Mia Hamm, American soccer player
 March 18 – Dane Cook, American comedian
 March 20 – Segundo Cernadas, Argentine actor
 March 21
 Balázs Kiss, Hungarian Olympic athlete
 Derartu Tulu, Ethiopian long-distance runner
 March 22
 Shawn Bradley, American basketball player
 Elvis Stojko, Canadian figure skater
 March 23
 Joe Calzaghe, Welsh boxer
 Judith Godrèche, French actress
 March 25 – Naftali Bennett, Israeli politician
 March 26 – Leslie Mann, American actress
 March 27
 Kieran Modra, Australian Paralympic swimmer and cyclist (d. 2019) 
 Charlie Haas, American professional wrestler
 Jimmy Floyd Hasselbaink, Dutch footballer
 March 28 – Nick Frost, English actor, comedian and screenwriter
 March 29
 Hera Björk, Icelandic singer
 Rui Costa, Portuguese footballer
 Priti Patel, British Indian politician, Secretary of State for the Home Department
 March 30 – Karel Poborský, Czech footballer

April

 April 2 – Eyal Berkovic, Israeli footballer
 April 3 – Jennie Garth, American actress 
 April 4 – Lisa Ray, Canadian model and actress
 April 7 – Tim Peake, British astronaut
 April 10 – Vincent Zhao, Chinese actor and martial artist
 April 12 - Marco Goecke, German choreographer
 April 13 – Mariusz Czerkawski, Polish ice hockey player
 April 15 – Arturo Gatti, Canadian boxer (d. 2009)
 April 16 – Conchita Martínez, Spanish tennis player
 April 17
 Jennifer Garner, American actress
 Muttiah Muralitharan, Sri Lankan cricketer
 April 19 – Rivaldo, Brazilian footballer
 April 20
 Lê Huỳnh Đức, Vietnamese footballer
 Carmen Electra, American actress and singer
 Željko Joksimović, Serbian singer, composer songwriter, multi-instrumentalist and producer
 April 26 – Avi Nimni, Israeli footballer
 April 30 – Takako Tokiwa, Japanese actress

May

 May 1 – Julie Benz, American actress
 May 2 – Dwayne Johnson, American professional wrestler and actor
 May 3 – Steve Barclay, British politician
 May 4 – Mike Dirnt, American rock musician and bassist (Green Day)
 May 5
Devin Townsend, Canadian musician
James Cracknell, British Olympic rower
 May 6
 Martin Brodeur, Canadian ice hockey goaltender
 Naoko Takahashi, Japanese long-distance runner
 May 7 – Asghar Farhadi, Iranian film director
 May 8 – Darren Hayes, Australian musician
 May 9 – Daniela Silivaș, Romanian gymnast
 May 10 – Katja Seizinger, German alpine skier
 May 19
 Jenny Berggren, Swedish rock singer (Ace of Base)
 Özcan Deniz, Turkish actor, singer and composer
 Claudia Karvan, Australian actress
 May 20
 Busta Rhymes, African-American rapper and actor
 Christophe Dominici, French rugby union player (d. 2020)
 May 21 – The Notorious B.I.G., African-American rapper (d. 1997)
 May 22 – Max Brooks, American horror author and screenwriter
 May 23 
 Rubens Barrichello, Brazilian racing driver
 Kevin Ullyett, Zimbabwean tennis player
 May 24 – Maia Sandu, Prime Minister of Moldova
 May 25
 Karan Johar, Indian film director, producer and screenwriter
 Cung Le,  Vietnamese-born American actor, and mixed martial artist
 Octavia Spencer, African-American actress, author and producer
 May 28 – Michael Boogerd, Dutch cyclist
 May 29 – Laverne Cox, American actress and LGBTQ+ advocate
 May 30 – Manny Ramírez, Dominican baseball player
 May 31 – Frode Estil, Norwegian cross-country skier

June

 June 2
 Wayne Brady, African-American comedian 
 Wentworth Miller, British-born American actor and screenwriter
 Natalie Morales, American journalist
 June 4 – Stoja, Serbian singer
 June 5 – Yogi Adityanath, Indian priest and politician
 June 6
 Noriaki Kasai, Japanese ski jumper
 Cristina Scabbia, Italian singer
 June 7 – Karl Urban, New Zealand actor
 June 15 - Poppy Montgomery, Australian-American actress 
 June 16 – John Cho, Korean-American actor and musician
 June 17 – Iztok Čop, Slovenian rower
 June 18 – Michal Yannai, Israeli actress
 June 19 – Jean Dujardin, French actor, comedian, and film director
 June 21 – Irene van Dyk, South African born New Zealand netball player
 June 23 – Zinedine Zidane, French-Algerian footballer and manager
 June 24
 Robbie McEwen, Australian professional road bicycle racer
 Kim Yeo-jin, South Korean actress and activist
 June 26 – Caroline Nokes, British politician
 June 28
 Geeta Tripathee, Nepali poet, lyricist and literary critic 
 Maria Butyrskaya, Russian figure skater
 June 29
 DJ Shadow, American DJ and record producer
 Samantha Smith, American peace activist (d. 1985)
 June 30 
 Molly Parker, Canadian actress

July

 July 1 – Steffi Nerius, German javelin thrower
 July 2 – Darren Shan, Irish author
 July 4
 Nina Badrić, Croatian pop singer
 Alexei Shirov, Spanish chess Grandmaster
 Craig Spearman, New Zealand cricketer
 July 5 
 Robert Esmie, Canadian Olympic athlete
 July 6 
 Isabelle Boulay, French Canadian singer
 Zhanna Pintusevich-Block, Ukrainian sprinter
 July 7
 Lisa Leslie, American basketball player
 Kirsten Vangsness, American actress and writer 
 July 8 – Sourav Ganguly, Indian cricketer
 July 10
 Sofía Vergara, Colombian-American actress, television producer, comedian, presenter and model
 Julián Legaspi, Uruguayan-Peruvian actor
 July 11 – Michael Rosenbaum, American actor, producer, singer and comedian
 July 17 – Jaap Stam, Dutch football player and coach
 July 20 – Jozef Stümpel, Slovak professional ice hockey player
 July 21 – Catherine Ndereba, Kenyan long-distance runner
 July 22
 Andrew Holness, 9th Prime Minister of Jamaica
 Keyshawn Johnson, American football player
 Nataša Ninković, Serbian actress
 July 23 – Marlon Wayans, American actor, comedian, producer, and screenwriter
 July 25 – Carole Samaha, Lebanese singer and actress
 July 27
 Clint Robinson, Australian kayaker
 Maya Rudolph, American actress, comedienne and singer
 Sheikh Muszaphar Shukor, Malaysian orthopaedic surgeon and the first commercial astronaut
 July 28
 Elizabeth Berkley, American actress
 Evan Farmer, American television host, actor, and musician
 July 29 – Wil Wheaton, American actor, blogger, and writer

August

 August 1 – Devon Hughes, American professional wrestler
 August 4 – Audrey Azoulay, French politician and civil servant
 August 6 – Geri Halliwell, British pop singer (Spice Girls)
 August 7 – Chip Roy, American politician
 August 9 – A-mei, Taiwanese singer
 August 10 – Angie Harmon, American actress
 August 12 – Demir Demirkan, Turkish rock musician and songwriter
 August 14 – Yoo Jae-suk, South Korean comedian and television comedy show host
 August 15 – Ben Affleck, American actor and film director
 August 19 
 Roberto Abbondanzieri, Argentine footballer
 Sammi Cheng, Hong Kong singer and actress
 August 27
 Denise Lewis, English track and field athlete
 The Great Khali, Indian promoter, actor, powerlifter and professional wrestler
 August 29 – Bae Yong-joon, South Korean actor
 August 30
 Cameron Diaz, American actress
 Pavel Nedvěd, Czech footballer

September

 September 2 – Sergejs Žoltoks, Latvian hockey player (d. 2004)
 September 4 
 Daniel Nestor, Serbian born-Canadian tennis player
 Françoise Yip, Chinese-Canadian actress
 September 6 – Idris Elba, English actor
 September 9 – Goran Višnjić, Croatian-American actor
 September 10 – Ghada Shouaa, Syrian athlete
 September 12 – Vebjørn Rodal, Norwegian middle distance athlete
 September 15 – Queen Letizia of Spain
 September 16
 Sprent Dabwido, Nauruan politician (d. 2019)
 Vebjørn Rodal, Norwegian Olympic athlete
 September 17 – Bobby Lee, Asian-American comedian
 September 19 – Ashot Nadanian, Armenian chess player, theoretician and coach
 September 20 – Victor Ponta, 3-Time Prime Minister of Romania
 September 21
 Liam Gallagher, British singer (Oasis)
 Erin Fitzgerald, Canadian-American voice actress
 September 23
 Pierre Amine Gemayel, Lebanese politician (d. 2006)
Galit Gutman, Israeli female model
 September 26 
 Beto O'Rourke, American politician, representative of Texas 16th congressional district
 Shawn Stockman, American singer and musician (Boyz II Men)
 September 27 – Gwyneth Paltrow, American actress
 September 28 – Dita Von Teese, American burlesque artist, model, and businesswoman
 September 30
 Ari Behn, Norwegian author (d. 2019)
 José Lima, Dominican baseball player (d. 2010)
 Shaan, Indian singer

October

 October 2 – Konstantinos Papadakis, Greek pianist
 October 3 – Kim Joo-hyuk, South Korean actor (d. 2017)
 October 5 – Grant Hill, African-American basketball player 
 October 6 – Mark Schwarzer, Australian soccer player
 October 11 – Claudia Black, Australian actress
 October 15 – Sandra Kim, Belgian singer, Eurovision Song Contest 1986 winner
 October 17
 Eminem, American rapper and actor 
 Sharon Leal, American actress and director
 Tarkan, Turkish singer
 October 21
 Evgeny Afineevsky, Russian-born American film director and producer
 Evhen Tsybulenko, Ukrainian professor of international law
 October 22 – Saffron Burrows, British actress
 October 24 – Kim Ji-soo, South Korean actress
 October 25 – Esther Duflo, French American economist, recipient of the Nobel Memorial Prize in Economic Sciences
 October 27
 Elissa, Lebanese singer
 Maria de Lurdes Mutola, Mozambican athlete
 October 28 – Brad Paisley, American country music singer, songwriter, and guitarist.
 October 29  
 Tracee Ellis Ross, American actress 
Gabrielle Union, American actress

November

 November 1
 Mario Barth, German comedian
 Toni Collette, Australian actress, singer, and musician
 Jenny McCarthy, American actress and model
 November 2 – Vladimir Vorobiev, Russian ice hockey player
 November 4 – Luís Figo, Portuguese footballer
 November 5 – Krassimir Avramov, Bulgarian singer and songwriter
 November 6
 Adonis Georgiades, Greek historian and politician, Greek Minister of Health
 Thandiwe Newton, British actress
 Rebecca Romijn, American actress and model
 November 8
 Gretchen Mol, American actress
 Maja Marijana, Serbian pop-folk singer
 November 9 
Eric Dane, American actor
Corin Tucker, American singer-songwriter and guitarist
 November 10 – Trevor Devall, Canadian voice actor and podcaster
 November 11 – Adam Beach, Canadian actor
 November 13 – Takuya Kimura, Japanese actor
 November 14 - Josh Duhamel, American actor and model
 November 15 – Jonny Lee Miller, English-American actor
 November 16
 Aurelia Dobre, Romanian artistic gymnast
 Missi Pyle, American actress and singer
 November 18 – Zubeen Garg, Indian singer 
 November 23 – Alfie Haaland, Norwegian footballer
 November 26 – Arjun Rampal, Indian actor
 November 29 
 Brian Baumgartner, American actor and director
 Andreas Goldberger, Austrian ski jumper
 Rodrigo Pessoa, Brazilian equestrian 
 November 30 – Christopher Fitzgerald, American actor

December

 December 4 – Yūko Miyamura, Japanese voice actress, actress and singer
 December 7 – Hermann Maier, Austrian skier
 December 9 
 Tré Cool, American rock musician and drummer (Green Day)
 Fabrice Santoro, French tennis player
 December 11 – Daniel Alfredsson, Swedish-Canadian former ice hockey player
 December 12 
 Wilson Kipketer, Kenyan-Danish athlete
 Arihito Muramatsu, Japanese baseball player
 December 13 – Mauricio Solís, Costa Rican footballer
 December 14 – Miranda Hart, British comedian and actress
 December 15
 Lee Jung-jae, South Korean actor
 Stuart Townsend, Irish actor
 December 16 – Zeljko Kalac, Australian footballer
 December 17 
 John Abraham, Indian actor 
 Iván Pedroso, Cuban long jumper
 December 18 – Eimear Quinn, Irish Celtic singer, Eurovision Song Contest 1996 winner
 December 19 – Alyssa Milano, American actress
 December 22 – Vanessa Paradis, French singer and actress 
 December 23 – Morgan, Italian singer, composer, multi-instrumentalist and X Factor (Italy) judge
 December 24 – Álvaro Mesén, Costa Rican footballer
 December 25
 Josh Freese, American musician and drummer
 Qu Yunxia, Chinese middle-distance runner
 December 27 – Colin Charvis, Welsh rugby player
 December 28 
 Patrick Rafter, Australian tennis player
 Kevin Stitt, American politician and businessman and 28th Governor of Oklahoma
 December 29 
 Jude Law, British actor
 Leonor Varela, Chilean actress
 December 31 – Grégory Coupet, French footballer

Deaths

January

 January 1
 Maurice Chevalier, French singer and actor (b. 1888)
 Patriarch Maximus V of Constantinople, Turkish Orthodox Christian bishop (b. 1897)
 January 3 – Frans Masereel, Belgian painter and graphic artist (b. 1889)
 January 7 – Emma P. Carr, American spectroscopist (b. 1880)
 January 8 – Wesley Ruggles, American film director (b. 1889)
 January 10 – Nubar Gulbenkian, Ottoman-born Armenian-British oil trader, socialite and intelligence operative (b. 1896)
 January 14 – King Frederick IX of Denmark (b. 1899)
 January 16 – Ross Bagdasarian, American record producer (b. 1919)
 January 17 – Rochelle Hudson, American actress (b. 1916; heart attack)
 January 19 – Mohammad Al-Abbasi, 45th Prime Minister of Jordan (b. 1914)
 January 25 – Erhard Milch, German field marshal and Luftwaffe officer (b. 1892)
 January 27 – Mahalia Jackson, American gospel singer (b. 1911)
 January 30
 Beatrice Forbes, Countess of Granard, American-born heiress (b. 1883)
 Prince Sisowath Watchayavong, 5th Prime Minister of Cambodia (b. 1891)
 January 31 – King Mahendra of Nepal (b. 1920)

February

 February 5 – Marianne Moore, American poet (b. 1887)
 February 7 – Walter Lang, American film director (b. 1896)
 February 11 – Colin Munro MacLeod, Canadian-American geneticist (b. 1909)
 February 17 – Gavriil Popov, Soviet Russian composer (b. 1904)
 February 19
 John Grierson, Scottish documentary filmmaker (b. 1898)
 Lee Morgan, American jazz trumpeter and composer (b. 1938)
 February 20
 Maria Goeppert-Mayer, German physicist, Nobel Prize laureate (b. 1906)
 Walter Winchell, American journalist (b. 1897)
 February 25 – Gottfried Fuchs, German footballer (b. 1889)

March

 March 8 – Erich von dem Bach-Zelewski, German Nazi politician and SS functionary (b. 1899)
 March 11 – Fredric Brown, American science fiction and mystery writer (b. 1906)
 March 20 – Marilyn Maxwell, American actress (b. 1921)
 March 23 – Cristóbal Balenciaga, Spanish couturier (b. 1895)
 March 27
 M. C. Escher, Dutch artist (b. 1898)
 Lorenzo Wright, American athlete (b. 1926)
 March 28 – Joseph Paul-Boncour, 71st Prime Minister of France (b. 1873)
 March 31 – Meena Kumari, Indian actress, singer and poet (b. 1933)

April

 April 2 – Franz Halder, German general (b. 1884)
 April 3 – Ferde Grofé, American pianist and composer (b. 1892)
 April 4 – Stefan Wolpe, German-born composer (b. 1902)
 April 5 – Isabel Jewell, American actress (b. 1907)
 April 6
 Brian Donlevy, American actor (b. 1901)
 Heinrich Lübke, 2nd President of the Federal Republic of Germany (b. 1894)
 April 7
 Abeid Karume, 1st President of Zanzibar (b. 1905)
 August Zaleski, 6th President of Poland (b. 1883)
 April 9 – James F. Byrnes, United States Secretary of State and Justice of the Supreme Court (b. 1882)
 April 16 – Yasunari Kawabata, Japanese novelist (b. 1899)
 April 20 – Andrea Andreen, Swedish physician (b. 1888)
 April 24 – Nora K. Chadwick, English philologist (b. 1891) 
 April 25 – George Sanders, Russian-born British actor (b. 1906)
 April 26 – Fernando Amorsolo, Filipino painter (b. 1892)
 April 27 – Kwame Nkrumah, 1st President of Ghana (b. 1909)
 April 29 – King Ntare V of Burundi (b. 1947)
 April 30 
 Gia Scala, British actress (b. 1934)
 Clara Campoamor, Spanish politician and suffragist (b. 1888)

May

 May 2 – J. Edgar Hoover, American civil servant, 1st Director of the Federal Bureau of Investigation (FBI) (b. 1895)
 May 3 – Bruce Cabot, American actor (b. 1904)
 May 4 
 Father Chrysanthus, Dutch arachnologist (b. 1905)
 Edward Calvin Kendall, American chemist, recipient of the Nobel Prize in Physiology or Medicine (b. 1886) 
 Josep Samitier, Spanish footballer (b. 1902)
 May 5
 Reverend Gary Davis, American blues and gospel singer (b. 1896)
 Frank Tashlin, American animation director (b. 1913)
 May 6 – Deniz Gezmiş, Turkish Marxist revolutionary (executed) (b. 1947)
 May 10 – Rhys Gemmell, Australian tennis champion (b. 1896)
 May 11 – Lee Beom-seok, Korean activist, 1st Prime Minister of South Korea (b. 1900)
 May 13 – Dan Blocker, American actor (b. 1928)
 May 15 – Nigel Green, South African-English actor (b. 1924)
 May 17 – Sir Gordon Lowe, Bt., British tennis player (b. 1884)
 May 18 – Sidney Franklin, American film director (b. 1893)
 May 22
 Cecil Day-Lewis, British poet (b. 1904)
 Dame Margaret Rutherford, English actress (b. 1892)
 May 23 – Richard Day, Canadian art director (b. 1896)
 May 24 – Asta Nielsen, Danish silent film star (b. 1881)
 May 28 
 The Duke of Windsor, former King Edward VIII of the United Kingdom (b. 1894)
 Violette Leduc, French writer (b. 1907)
 May 29 – Prithviraj Kapoor, Indian actor and director (b. 1906)

June

 June 12
 Saul Alinsky, American political activist (b. 1909)
 Ludwig von Bertalanffy, Austrian biologist (b. 1901)
 Edmund Wilson, American writer and critic (b. 1895)
 June 13
 Georg von Békésy, Hungarian biophysicist, recipient of the Nobel Prize in Physiology or Medicine (b. 1899)
 Clyde McPhatter, American singer (b. 1932)
 June 18 – Milton Humason, American astronomer (b. 1891)
 June 22 – Vladimir Durković, Serbian footballer (b. 1937)
 June 28 – Prasanta Chandra Mahalanobis, Indian scientist (b. 1893)
 June 30 – Joe Deakin, British Olympic athlete (b. 1879)

July

 July 2 – Joseph Fielding Smith, 10th president of the Church of Jesus Christ of Latter-day Saints (b. 1876)
 July 5 – Raúl Leoni, 55th President of Venezuela (b. 1905)
 July 6 – Brandon deWilde, American actor (b. 1942)
 July 7
 Patriarch Athenagoras I of Constantinople (b. 1886)
 King Talal of Jordan (b. 1909)
 July 8 – Ghassan Kanafani, Palestinian author (b. 1936)
 July 20 – Geeta Dutt, Indian singer (b. 1930)
 July 21
 Ralph Craig, American Olympic athlete (b. 1889)
 King Jigme Dorji Wangchuck (b. 1929)
 July 24 − Lance Reventlow, English playboy, entrepreneur and racing driver (b. 1936)
 July 27 – Count Richard von Coudenhove-Kalergi, Austrian-Japanese politician, geopolitician and philosopher (b. 1894)
 July 28 – Helen Traubel, American soprano (b. 1903)
 July 31
 Alfons Gorbach, Austrian politician, 15th Chancellor of Austria (b. 1898)
 Paul-Henri Spaak, Belgian politician and statesman, 31st Prime Minister of Belgium and 2nd Secretary General of NATO (b. 1899)

August

 August 8 – Andrea Feldman, American actress (b. 1948)
 August 9 – Ernst von Salomon, German writer (b. 1902)
 August 11 – Max Theiler, South African-born American virologist, recipient of the Nobel Prize in Physiology or Medicine (b. 1899)
 August 14
 Oscar Levant, American pianist and actor (b. 1906)
 Jules Romains, French poet and writer (b. 1885)
 August 16 – Pierre Brasseur, French actor (b. 1905)
 August 19 – Rudolf Belling, German sculptor (b. 1886)
 August 20 – Juan Manuel Gálvez, 39th President of Honduras (b. 1887)
 August 24 – Jinichi Kusaka, Japanese admiral (b. 1888)
 August 26 – Francis Chichester, British sailor and aviator (b. 1901)
 August 28 – Prince William of Gloucester (b. 1941)
 August 29 – René Leibowitz, French composer (b. 1913)

September

 September 1 – He Xiangning, Chinese revolutionary, feminist, politician, painter and poet (b. 1878)
 September 5 (Munich massacre):
 Yossef Romano, Israeli weightlifter (b. 1940)
 Moshe Weinberg, Israeli wrestling coach (b. 1939)
 September 6 (Munich massacre):
 David Mark Berger, Israeli weightlifter (b. 1944)
 Ze'ev Friedman, Israeli weightlifter (b. 1944)
 Yossef Gutfreund, Israeli wrestling referee (b. 1931)
 Eliezer Halfin, Israeli wrestler (b. 1948)
 Amitzur Shapira, Israeli athletics coach (b. 1932)
 Kehat Shorr, Israeli shooting coach (b. 1919)
 Mark Slavin, Israeli wrestler (b. 1954)
 Andre Spitzer, Israeli fencing coach (b. 1945)
 September 8 – Warren Kealoha, American Olympic swimmer (b. 1903)
 September 12 – William Boyd, American actor (b. 1895)
 September 15
 Ásgeir Ásgeirsson, 2nd President of Iceland (b. 1894)
 Geoffrey Fisher, Archbishop of Canterbury (b. 1887)
 September 17 – Akim Tamiroff, Armenian actor (b. 1899)
 September 19 – Robert Casadesus, French pianist (b. 1899)
 September 21 – Henry de Montherlant, French writer (b. 1896)
 September 25 – Max Fleischer, American animator (b. 1883)

October

 October 1 – Louis Leakey, British paleontologist (b. 1903) 
 October 5 – Ivan Yefremov, Soviet paleontologist and science fiction author (b. 1908)
 October 9 – Miriam Hopkins, American actress (b. 1902)
 October 10 – Kenneth Edgeworth, Irish army officer, economist and astronomer (b. 1880)
 October 16 – Leo G. Carroll, English actor (b. 1886)
 October 17 – George, Crown Prince of Serbia (b. 1887)
 October 20 – Harlow Shapley, American astronomer (b. 1885)
 October 24
 Jackie Robinson, African-American baseball player (b. 1919) 
 Claire Windsor, American actress (b. 1892)
 October 26 – Igor Sikorsky, Soviet aviation engineer (b. 1889)
 October 28 – Mitchell Leisen, American film director (b. 1898)

November

 November 1 – Ezra Pound, American poet (b. 1885)
 November 5 – Reginald Owen, English actor (b. 1887)
 November 12 – Rudolf Friml, Czech composer (b. 1879)
 November 13 – Arnold Jackson, British Olympic athlete (b. 1891)
 November 17
 Thomas C. Kinkaid, American admiral (b. 1888)
 Eugène Minkowski, French psychiatrist (b. 1885)
 November 23 – Marie Wilson, American actress (b. 1916)
 November 25 – Henri Coandă, Romanian aerodynamics pioneer (b. 1886)
 November 28 
 Havergal Brian, English composer (b. 1876)
 Princess Sibylla of Saxe-Coburg and Gotha (b. 1908)
 November 30 – Hans Erich Apostel, Austrian composer (b. 1901)

December

 December 1 – Antonio Segni, 34th Prime Minister of Italy (1955–1957, 1959–1960), 4th President of the Italian Republic (b. 1891)
 December 2 – Ettore Bastico, Italian field marshal (b. 1876)
 December 9
 William Dieterle, German film director (b. 1893)
 Louella Parsons, American gossip columnist (b. 1881)
 December 13 – René Mayer, 91st Prime Minister of France (b. 1895)
 December 20 – Günter Eich, German lyricist, dramatist, and author (b. 1907)
 December 21 – Paul Hausser, German Waffen SS general and commander (b. 1880)
 December 23 – Andrei Tupolev, Soviet aircraft designer (b. 1888)
 December 24 
 Charles Atlas, Italian-born American strongman and sideshow performer (b. 1892)
 Gisela Richter, English art historian (b. 1882)
 December 25 – C. Rajagopalachari, Indian politician and freedom-fighter. Last Governor-General of India (1948–50) (b. 1878)
 December 26 – Harry S. Truman, 33rd President of the United States (b. 1884)
 December 27 – Lester B. Pearson, 14th Prime Minister of Canada, recipient of the Nobel Peace Prize (b. 1897)
 December 31 – Roberto Clemente, Puerto Rican baseball player (b. 1934)

Nobel Prizes

 Physics – John Bardeen, Leon Neil Cooper, John Robert Schrieffer
 Chemistry – Christian B. Anfinsen, Stanford Moore, William H. Stein
 Physiology or Medicine – Gerald M. Edelman, Rodney R. Porter
 Literature – Heinrich Böll
 Peace – not awarded
 Economics – John Hicks, Kenneth Arrow

Other academic awards
 Turing Award – Edsger W. Dijkstra

References

 
Leap years in the Gregorian calendar